Nuku District is a district in Serua Province in Fiji.

Districts of Serua Province